The Charodeika class was a pair of monitors built for the Imperial Russian Navy in the late 1860s. They were designed by the British shipbuilder Charles Mitchell and built in Saint Petersburg. Both ships were assigned to the Baltic Fleet and had fairly uneventful careers mostly assigned to training units.  struck a rock in 1869 and had to be run aground lest she sink. They were reclassified as coast-defense ironclads in 1892 and Rusalka sank during a storm in the Gulf of Finland the next year with the loss of all hands. Her sister ship  continued in service until 1907 and was eventually scrapped in 1911–12. Rusalkas wreck was discovered in 2003 by an expedition sponsored by the Estonian Maritime Museum.

Design and description
By late 1863, the Russian Admiralty Board had begun planning for the second generation of ironclads to succeed those ships then under construction and issued a requirement on 12 November for a twin-screw low-freeboard ship that could sail throughout the Baltic Sea. Before even deciding which designs to accept, the Admiralty decided to order eight ships of various types in March 1864. Charles Mitchell was allocated only one of the eight ships before he submitted four different designs for the competition in May–June. Two ships of his simplest design were awarded to a new builder, S. G. Kudriavtsev, who was provided facilities at the state-owned Galernyi Island Shipyard. In addition the Admiralty committed itself to furnishing the armament, armor, engines and boilers as well as a variety of smaller components for the two ships.

The ships were designed to displace , but turned out to be overweight and actually displaced . They were fitted with a plough-shaped ram that projected  forward of the bow. The Charodeikas were fitted with a double bottom and their hulls were subdivided by watertight bulkheads into 25 compartments. Their crew numbered 13 officers and 171 crewmen in 1877.

The ships had a freeboard of only  and their decks were often awash in any sort of moderate sea. They rolled heavily and were very unmaneuverable, often not responding to the ship's wheel until 20 degrees of rudder was applied. The monitors were fitted with three iron pole masts, probably fore-and-aft rigged, and used to steady the ship rather than for propulsion.

Propulsion
The Charodeika class had two simple horizontal direct-acting steam engines, built by the Baird Works of Saint Petersburg. The monitors also had a donkey boiler for the small steam engine that powered the ventilation fans and pumps.

Armament
The monitors were designed to be armed with four Obukhov  rifled guns, a pair in each Coles-type turret. Various deckhouses and ventilation hatches prevented the turrets from firing directly forward or aft, so that each turret could bear approximately 150° to each side. Difficulties in manufacturing the guns and the delayed construction of the monitors themselves forced the Admiralty to change the armament to a pair of the 9-inch guns in the forward turret and a pair of  smoothbore muzzle-loading Rodman guns in the aft turret. These guns were replaced by another pair of 9-inch rifled guns beginning in 1871. They were replaced in their turn in 1878–79 by two longer, more powerful 9-inch Obukhov guns. The ship carried 75 rounds for each gun.

Light guns for use against torpedo boats are not known to have been fitted aboard the Charodeika-class ships before the 1870s when a variety of guns were added, although their numbers, calibers, and locations are only partially known. Charodeika received four 4-pounder  guns, two mounted on the roofs of each gun turret while Rusalka had a total of three guns with only one gun on her aft turret. Other guns known have been fitted included  Engström quick-firing (QF) guns,  QF Hotchkiss guns,  QF Hotchkiss five-barreled revolving cannon, and  Nordenfelt guns.

Armor
The turrets had  of armor, also backed by teak, and the conning tower was 4.5 inches thick.

Ships

Construction and service
The monitors were intended to be delivered by 27 May 1867, but construction was held up by delays in delivery of the blueprints, armor, changes made while under construction and the untimely death of Kudriavtsev in August 1865. The contract was transferred to Mitchell who completed them in 1869, two years after their scheduled delivery date for the cost of 762,000 roubles each. Both ships spent their entire careers with the Baltic Fleet. She was assigned to the Artillery Training Detachment of the Baltic Fleet in March 1870 and Charodeika was later assigned to the Mine (Torpedo) Training Detachment.

Both monitors were reclassified as coast-defense ironclads on 13 February 1892 and Rusalka sank in a storm on 7 September 1893 during a voyage between Reval (Tallinn) and Helsingfors (Helsinki) with the loss of her entire crew of 177 officers and enlisted men. Despite an extensive search, the only traces of her found were one body and some debris that washed ashore. Charodeika remained in service until 31 March 1907 when she was turned over to the Port of Kronstadt for disposal. The ship was stricken from the Navy List on 7 April and was finally scrapped in 1911–12.

The wreck is generally intact although draped with snagged fishing nets. The aft turret, however, has fallen out of the ship.

See also
 List of ironclads of Russia

Notes

Footnotes

Bibliography

 
 

Naval ships of Russia
Ironclad warships of the Imperial Russian Navy
Ironclad classes